Wikel is an unincorporated community in Monroe County, West Virginia, United States. Wikel is southwest of Union.

The community most likely was named after the local Wikel (or Wigal) family.

References

Unincorporated communities in Monroe County, West Virginia
Unincorporated communities in West Virginia